Cantalejo is a municipality located in the province of Segovia, Castile and León, Spain. According to the 2004 census (INE), the municipality had a population of 3,622 inhabitants.  The dialect known as Gacería was spoken here.

References

Municipalities in the Province of Segovia